Herzegovina or Hercegovina may refer to:

 Herzegovina, geographical and historical region in Bosnia and Herzegovina
 East Herzegovina, eastern part of the region of Herzegovina
 Sanjak of Herzegovina, an administrative region of the Ottoman Empire, from 15th to 19th century
 Herzegovina Eyalet, an administrative province of the Ottoman Empire, in 19th century
 Old Herzegovina, part of historical Herzegovina, attached to Montenegro since 1878
 SAO Herzegovina, Serbian Autonomous Oblast (Region) of Herzegovina (1991)
 Herzegovina-Neretva Canton, an administrative unit in Bosnia and Herzegovina
 West Herzegovina Canton, an administrative unit in Bosnia and Herzegovina
 Eparchy of Zahumlje and Herzegovina, a diocese of the Serbian Orthodox Church

See also
 Herzegovina Uprising (disambiguation)
 Herzegovinian (disambiguation)
 Bosnia (disambiguation)